Varun, Iran may refer to:

 Varun, Isfahan, a village in Kuhpayeh District, Isfahan County, Isfahan Province
 Varun, Yazd, a village in Aqda District, Ardakan County, Yazd Province

See also